Stephanie Laura Scurrah Grundsøe (born 27 January 2000) is a Danish sport shooter.

She participated at the 2018 ISSF World Shooting Championships, winning a medal. She won the gold medal at the girls' 10 metre air rifle at the 2018 Summer Youth Olympics.

From 2016 to 2019 Grundsøe studied at the Norwegian College of Elite Sports in Kongsvinger, Norway.

References

External links

Living people
2000 births
Danish female sport shooters
ISSF rifle shooters
Shooters at the 2018 Summer Youth Olympics
Youth Olympic gold medalists for Denmark
21st-century Danish women